Afigya Kwabre North is one of the constituencies represented in the Parliament of Ghana. It elects one Member of Parliament (MP) by the first past the post system of election. Afigya Kwabre North is located in the Afigya Kwabre North District of the Ashanti Region of Ghana.

Boundaries
The Afigya Kwabre North constituency is located entirely within the boundaries of the Afigya Kwabre North District in the Ashanti Region. The district itself was inaugurated on 15 March 2018.

Members of Parliament

Nana Amaniampong Marfo of the New Patriotic Party was the first ever elected MP for this constituency in the 2012 Ghanaian general election.  He retained his seat in the 2016 Ghanaian general election.

Elections

See also
List of Ghana Parliament constituencies

References

External links
Election Passport - American University

Parliamentary constituencies in the Ashanti Region
2012 establishments in Ghana